Koxhausen is a municipality in the district of Bitburg-Prüm, in Rhineland-Palatinate, western Germany.

References

External links
Site of the Koxhausen fire brigade with a history and many photos of Koxhausen 

Bitburg-Prüm